Patrick Orreal (born 17 March 1964) is an Australian former professional darts player.

Career 
Orreal qualified for the inaugural Grand Slam of Darts for reaching the final of the PDC Australian Open where he lost to Glen Power. The result meant that Power had initially qualified for the event but was forced to withdraw due to visa problems and Orreal replaced him. He reached the last 16 of the 2007 Grand Slam of Darts, defeating Niels de Ruiter and Phill Nixon to finish second in his group before losing to Jelle Klaasen 10–9.

In February 2008, it was announced that Orreal was to join the PDC full-time but failed to recapture his form from the Grand Slam, winning prize money in only one of his first ten events and failed to qualify for the UK Open. He then reached the semi-final of the Australian Open Players Championship, achieving wins against Mellisa Sinnott, Barry Jouannet, Denis Ovens and Warren French before losing to Paul Nicholson. He then suffered a first round exit from the Oceanic Masters, a tournament where the winner wins a place in the PDC World Darts Championship.

Orreal soon departed from the Pro Tour and returned to the AGP circuit.

External links 
Stats on Darts Database

1964 births
Australian darts players
Living people
British Darts Organisation players
Professional Darts Corporation associate players
People from Brisbane